Clemendana is a monotypic moth genus in the subfamily Arctiinae. Its single species, Clemendana pacifera, is found in Brazil. Both the genus and species were first described by William Schaus in 1929.

References

Lithosiini